The year 2012 in esports (professional gaming).

Calendar of events

(for extended events the final date is listed)
 

 
Esports by year